Mauern is a municipality in the district of Freising in Bavaria in Germany.

References

Freising (district)